The President's Certificate of Merit was created June 6, 1946 by Executive Order 9734 signed by US President Harry Truman, "for award by the President or at his direction to any civilian who on or after December 7, 1941 (see Attack on Pearl Harbor), has performed a meritorious act or service which has aided the United States or any nation engaged with the United States in the prosecution of World War II, and for which there is no other suitable award or recognition."

The award was for an act or service that was of high degree, but not sufficiently extraordinary or meritorious enough to warrant the Medal for Merit. The Certificate of Merit is generally awarded at the recommendation of the Medal for Merit Board, and its design must be approved by the Board. No person can receive more than one award, and the certificates may be awarded posthumously.

In 1948, 324 Certificates were awarded, including 67 for people who served in various capacities in connection with production of aircraft or aircraft components, or in connection with air carrier operations under contract to the Army Air Forces or the Air Transport Command. The remaining 257 served in some capacity with or for the Office of Scientific Research and Development.

Notable recipients 
 John G. Trump
Gladys Anslow
 Donald Balfour
 Hendrik Wade Bode
 Thomas H. Chilton
 Harry Chapin
 Hugh Latimer Dryden
 Donald G. Fink
 Ernst Guillemin
 W. W. Hansen
 Henry M. Hart Jr.
 Arthur R. von Hippel
 Franz N. D. Kurie
 Edward H. Lambert
 Wendell Mitchell Latimer
 Richard C. Lord
 Holbrook Mann MacNeille
 Nathan M. Newmark
 Joseph M. Pettit
 W. Conway Pierce
 Ernest C. Pollard
 Mary E. Switzer
 Ernst Weber (engineer)

References

Further reading 
 March 31, 1948 Medal for Merit Board memo from Richmond B. Keech to President Harry Truman.

Civil awards and decorations of the United States
Awards established in 1946
1946 establishments in the United States